United States v. Zubaydah, 595 U.S. ___ (2022), was a United States Supreme Court case related to the state secrets privilege.

Background 

Abu Zubaydah was captured by the United States in Pakistan in 2002 and has been alleged to be a member of Al Qaeda. While in custody he had been transferred to multiple sites, including several black sites operated by the Central Intelligence Agency (CIA), before he was transferred indefinitely to the Guantanamo Bay detention camp by 2003. While the information on these sites was classified, activities at one site in Poland became public knowledge after Zubaydah and his counsel requested an investigation in 2010 from Polish official officials into his treatment while at a black site in Poland. The report found that Zubaydah had been subjected to waterboarding and other forms of torture at the black site under direction of two CIA contractors. 

Zubaydah sought disclosures from the two contractors in 2017 through federal courts to testify to their role in his detention. The CIA objected, claiming that any information regarding the black site was classified and could not be disclosed, even if the responses that Zubaydah sought did not reveal anything about the site's location. Zubaydah countered that the site's general location in Poland had already been revealed to the public through other means. He prevailed in the district court and a panel of the United States Court of Appeals for the Ninth Circuit affirmed, over Judge Ronald M. Gould's dissent. Judge Daniel Bress, joined by 11 colleagues, dissented from the denial of rehearing en banc.

Supreme Court 

Certiorari was granted in the case on April 26, 2021. Oral arguments were heard on October 6, 2021. On March 3, 2022, a divided Court reversed the Ninth Circuit in a mostly 7–2 vote. The majority decision was written by Justice Stephen Breyer, joined in full by Chief Justice John Roberts and in part by Justices Brett Kavanaugh and Amy Coney Barrett. Breyer acknowledged that while information about the CIA black site in Poland had been identified in public, the type of information that Zubaydah sought "would tend to confirm (or deny) the existence of a CIA detention site in Poland", and thus there was reasonable cause for the government to consider any further confirmation a matter of national security, since this potentially could expose the existence of black sites in other countries. 

Justice Clarence Thomas wrote a concurrence to the judgement which Justice Samuel Alito joined. Thomas agreed with the judgement of the majority, but believed that Zubaydah did not need the information he was requesting from the contractors to pursue his case. Justice Elena Kagan also wrote a concurrence, but stated the case should be remanded to the district court to review what information Zubaydah sought that could be separated from state secrets.

Justice Neil Gorsuch wrote the dissent, joined by Sonia Sotomayor. Gorsuch argued that the fact that Zubayduh was held at a black site in Poland between 2002 and 2003 was now public knowledge and thus no longer a state secret, and was concerned about the over-classification of information by the government. He also stated, in agreement with Kagan, that the case should be remanded to district court to separate out what information could be obtained without evoking any state secret privilege.

References

External links 
 

2022 in United States case law
United States Supreme Court cases
United States Supreme Court cases of the Roberts Court
Legal issues related to the September 11 attacks
United States statutory interpretation case law
United States state secrets privilege case law